Alastair Kenneth McTavish (22 December 1904 — 23 March 1961) was a Scottish first-class cricketer and banker.

McTavish was born in December 1904 at Rothiemay, Banffshire. He was educated at the Royal High School, Edinburgh. McIntyre made his debut for Scotland in a first-class cricket match against Ireland at Dublin in 1929. He played first-class cricket for Scotland on a further fourteen appearances to 1939, playing seven matches against Ireland the remainder against touring international sides and county teams. Playing as a wicket-keeper, he scored 675 runs at an average of 25.96; he made three half centuries and one century, a score of 109 against the touring South Americans in 1932. As wicket-keeper, he took nine catches and made four stumpings. A banker by profession, McTavish died in March 1961 at Newton Mearns, Renfrewshire.

References

External links
 

1904 births
1961 deaths
People from Banffshire
People educated at the Royal High School, Edinburgh
Scottish bankers
Scottish cricketers